Emma Elizabeth Carney (born 29 July 1971) is an Australian former professional triathlete and two time World Triathlon Champion. She is one of a few triathletes in the world to have won two ITU world titles. She was the world number one triathlete according to ITU rankings in 1995, 1996 and 1997, and achieved 19 World Cup wins. With seven wins in 1996, she also holds the record for the greatest number of ITU World Series wins in a single season.

She is an inductee of the Sport Australia Hall of Fame (2016), the International Triathlon Union Hall of Fame (2014), and the Triathlon Australia Hall of Fame (2012).

Early life
Carney was born in England, but moved to Australia with her family, including sister Clare who also became an athlete, at an early age.

Carney began her sporting life as a runner: when she was in grade four, she was the only girl to win a medal in the school (Wesley College) cross-country mixed race. As a teenager, Carney remembers jogging after school every day. "From that time on there has hardly been a day when I haven't trained", she said. At 13 she set a Victorian record in her 3,000 m debut, and at 18 she was winning national school titles. She wanted to go to the Olympics, but realised she was not going to hit her peak as a middle-distance athlete until her late 20s. She reached the finals in the under-20 national championships in the 1,500 m and 3,000 m. As she thought running for another 10 years would be "boring", she decided instead to do some cross-training and triathlons. Carney quickly became one of the few athletes to represent Australia in two sports – athletics and triathlon.

Triathlon
In the spring of 1993, Carney tried her first triathlon, which she won after overcoming a seven-minute deficit from a 700-metre swim. Her accountant father, David, told her, "It's 18 months until the world championship in Wellington. If you learn to swim faster, you'll be the best triathlete in the world." She recalled, "My father went over everything I had to do point by point and it all made sense."

ITU racing
In November 1994, she fulfilled her father's prediction, winning the ITU World title – her first international triathlon – by a record margin of 2 minutes 12 seconds. From June 1995 to April 1997, Carney recorded an unbroken string of 12 straight ITU World Cup wins. After a narrow loss to Michellie Jones at the 1997 Monaco World Cup, she recorded another four straight World Cup victories, before adding another ITU World Champion title in November. Viral infections meant that she failed to win the 1995 and 1996 World Championships, but still finished second in 1996.

Her fellow 1997 World Champion, Chris McCormack said, "Emma is hard!", referring to her shockingly long training at fearlessly high intensity, and her ruthless ferocity in competition.

Decline
After winning the Ishigaki World Cup race in April 1998, Carney never again won a World Cup or World Championship race. In July she could only manage 15th in the World Cup race at Gamagōri, then failed to finish at the Lausanne World Championships in August, but partly recovered to finish fourth in the November Auckland World Cup race. Following a metatarsal injury in 1999 which prevented her running for eight weeks, she finished 3rd in the Montreal World Championships. In 2000, she failed to qualify for the Australian Olympic women's triathlon team, despite an appeal to the CAS.

She described this period as a "shitty time", when she could not work out what was wrong. She said, "my reaction to racing badly was to train harder—which was the worst thing I could do for my heart." Despite her problems, she won some races, including the 1998 Australian National Championship, the 1999 Australian Long Course Championship and the 2000 Australian long course and sprint national championships.

Retirement from professional triathlon
Carney was forced to retire from professional triathlon in 2004 after suffering a cardiac arrest in Canada. She was later diagnosed with ventricular tachycardia, a life-threatening condition that causes the heart to beat too fast and out of control, usually during high-intensity anaerobic exercise. The doctors found it difficult to diagnose her condition, partly because Carney's resting heart rate when asleep was only 21 bpm. In October 2004 surgeons implanted an implantable cardioverter defibrillator (ICD) in the right ventricle of her heart.

She later speculated, "I always raced so hard that maybe it contributed to damaging my heart. Having said that, I probably was unable to approach it differently. That was just the way I was wired – all or nothing."

Later life
In 2006, Carney's elder sister Jane died of cancer. She had thought that her heart problems were "really hard", but describes her sister's death as "a well of anguish that surpasses anything I'd ever seen or felt in life."

After her ICD implant, doctors told her that she could not exercise at all, but Carney found that not exercising made her heart worse and that instead it was better to exercise a little every day to keep it under control. She then found that she could do "quite a lot" of training, provided she avoids damaging high-intensity spurts. For example, she completed an iroman-length (180 km) bike ride, and hopes eventually to complete a full iron-distance race. Occasionally, she exercised too hard, causing her ICD to "shock" her heart, as happened once when she was out running with her father. It also happened in 2008 when she was taking part in the 299 km Melbourne-to-Warrnambool bike race, when she forgot about her condition and attempted to chase down the leading pack.

Carney has had a strained relationship with her sport's governing body, Triathlon Australia (TA), partly because of their reluctance to allow her to compete, with her well-known heart condition, in their races. She has called on TA to require annual ECG and ultrasound tests of their elite athletes.

Carney now spends her time coaching High Performance Triathletes in Australia.  The decline of the Sport of Triathlon in Australia has led her to speak out about the 'appalling waste of taxpayers money for no result'.

Emma has written her autobiography – Hard Wired.  Life, Death and Triathlon – which she details her life from diaries and journals she kept.  It has been described as one of the most honest sporting autobiographies written by an athlete, because Emma details her early life, her commitment to her dream and her sporting excellence with the same attention to details she displayed in her sporting career.  Unable to write on her Olympic Appeal, Emma had a historian reconstruct her appeal proving she was not afforded a fair trial.  Her father David also provides a chapter which shines further light on this.  In her Autobiography, Emma also describes the loss of her sister Jane to cancer and her brief marriage which she claims the only highlight was the birth of her son Jack.

Results
Note: only top-ten finishes are shown in the table below.

Source: ITU profile.

Awards and honours
 2012 – Triathlon Australia Hall of Fame
 2014 – International Triathlon Union Hall of Fame
 2016 – Inducted as Athlete Member of the Sport Australia Hall of Fame

References

External links
 Official website

1971 births
Australian female triathletes
Duathletes
Living people
People educated at Wesley College (Victoria)
Sport Australia Hall of Fame inductees
Sportspeople from Melbourne
English emigrants to Australia
Sportswomen from Victoria (Australia)